Urvaste is a village in Antsla Parish, Võru County, in southeastern Estonia.

Before the 2017 Administrative Reform, the village belonged to Urvaste Parish.

Tamme-Lauri oak, the thickest and oldest tree in Estonia, is located near Urvaste.

See also
 Kirikuküla, Võru County

References

Villages in Võru County
Antsla Parish